Defending champion William Larned defeated William Clothier in the Challenge Round 6–1, 6–2, 5–7, 1–6, 6–1 to win the men's singles tennis title at the 1909 U.S. National Championships. Clothier defeated Maurice McLoughlin in the All Comers' Final.

The event was held at the Newport Casino in Newport, R.I. in the United States.

Challenge round

All Comers' finals

References

Men's Singles
1909